Tyler Mills is an American poet, essayist, editor, and scholar. She is Editor-in-Chief of The Account, an Assistant Professor of English at New Mexico Highlands University and the author of Hawk Parable, winner of the 2017 Akron Poetry Prize (University of Akron Press 2019) and Tongue Lyre, winner of the 2011 Crab Orchard Series in Poetry First Book Award (Southern Illinois University Press 2013). She is also an editor and teacher and lives in Brooklyn, NY.

Work 

Hawk Parable was included in The Millions must-read poetry April 2019. Tongue Lyre was fourth on the Believer's "Readers Favorite Works of Poetry in 2013" list. Her poetry publications include The New Yorker, The Believer (magazine), the Boston Review, and Blackbird (journal)

Awards 
  2017 Akron Poetry Prize 
  2015 Copper Nickel Editor's Prize in Prose
  2011 Crab Orchard Series in Poetry First Book Award
  2009 Richard Peterson Poetry Prize, Crab Orchard Review
  2008 Third Coast prize
  Best New Poets 2007 anthology.  
  2006 Gulf Coast Poetry Prize

Bibliography

Collections

Anthologies
Best new poets 2007. Trethewey, Natasha D., 1966-, Livingood, Jeb. Charlottesville, Va: Samovar Press. 2007. . OCLC 154793308.

Bax : best American experimental writing. 2015. Abramson, Seth, 1976-, Damiani, Jesse,, Kearney, Douglas,. Middletown, Connecticut. . OCLC 944156411.

List of poems

References

Year of birth missing (living people)
Living people
American women poets
The New Yorker people
21st-century American women